De Witt Yard is a railyard in East Syracuse, New York (6228 Fremont Rd ) (part of DeWitt, New York). It was originally built by the New York Central in the 1870s. It is now located in the Albany Division of CSXT.

Inland port
A study concluded in 2017 identified the yard as the best location in central New York as an 'inland port', or dry port. New York transportation officials agreed to provide funds to transform the rail yard into an intermodal cargo facility to ship containers to and from ocean ports, namely through ExpressRail services in Port Newark–Elizabeth Marine Terminal: the largest container port in the Port of New York and New Jersey.

See also
Selkirk hurdle
Selkirk Yard

References

External links
PANYNJ
Photos
Inland Port Study
De Witt/Minoa

CSX Transportation
 Rail yards in New York (state)
DeWitt, New York
Dry ports